Mustafa Nadarević (2 May 1943 – 22 November 2020) was a Bosnian actor. Widely considered one of the greatest actors from the former Yugoslavia, he starred in over 70 films, including The Smell of Quinces (1982), When Father Was Away on Business (1985), Reflections (1987), The Glembays (1988), Kuduz (1989), Silent Gunpowder (1990), The Perfect Circle (1997), Days and Hours (2004), Mirage (2004) and Halima's Path (2012).

More recently, Nadarević was best known for playing Izet Fazlinović in the Bosnian sitcom Lud, zbunjen, normalan from the beginning of the series in 2007 until his death in 2020.

Early life and career
Nadarević was born on 2 May 1943 in Banja Luka to  Bosniak parents Mehmed Nadarević and Asja Memić. They fled from Banja Luka to Zagreb due to bombing of the city. Mehmed also served in the Croatian Home Guard, before passing away in 1946. Nadarević attended elementary school in Zagreb and Bosanski Novi, and Gymnasium in Rijeka. He studied acting at the Academy of Performing Arts in Sarajevo and got his diploma at the Academy of Dramatic Art in Zagreb. 

During his long acting career, Nadarević built a reputation as one of the most recognizable character actors in the Balkans. In the former Yugoslavia, Nadarević was seen playing in roles mostly as a Partisan soldier. He was best known for his work in the films When Father Was Away on Business, Reflections, The Glembays, among many others. His performance as Leone Glembay in the Antun Vrdoljak film adaptation of Messrs. Glembay is widely considered to be one of the most significant acting milestones in Yugoslav film history. It won him the Golden Arena for Best Actor at the 1988 Pula Film Festival, among other accolades.

Nadarević played a variety of roles in various films produced throughout the areas of the Balkans. In 1991, he won the award for Best Actor at the 17th Moscow International Film Festival for his role in Silent Gunpowder.

Nadarević's last role as Croatian Army general Janko Bobetko, was in Antun Vrdoljak's 2019 film General.

During the last years of his life, Nadarević was best known for playing the hilarious television character, Izet Fazlinović, in the Bosnian sitcom Lud, zbunjen, normalan; the character can be described as sexually unsatisfied 70-year-old man who will do anything but work to own a dollar, and throw insults at anyone he can.

Personal life
Nadarević's wife, Slavica Radović (25 April 1964 – 7 June 2012), a Slovenian costume designer, died at the age of 48 after a decade-long struggle with breast cancer. She and Nadarević had been in a relationship for twenty years.

Health and death
Nadarević revealed that he was diagnosed with lung cancer in January 2020. He died on 22 November 2020 in his home in Zagreb, due to complications of the same disease.

Filmography

Film

Gravitacija ili fantastična mladost činovnika Borisa Horvata (1968) – Blaja
Timon (1973)
Snađi se, druže (1981)
Zločin u školi (1982) – Bartol
The Smell of Quinces (1982) – Mustafa
Kiklop (1982) – Don Fernando
U raljama života (1984)
Zadarski memento (1984) – Bepo Marini
Mala pljačka vlaka (1984) – Paragraf
Horvat's Choice (1985) – Vinko Benčina
When Father Was Away on Business (1985) – Zijah Zijo Zulfikarpašić
Ljubavna pisma s predumišljajem (1985) – Dr. Bošnjak
The War Boy (1985) – Mill manager
Večernja zvona (1986) – Matko
Poslednji skretničar uzanog koloseka (1986) – Mungo
Dobrovoljci (1986) – Gynecologist
Ljubezni Blanke Kolak (1987) – Pavel
Hudodelci (1987) – Ljuba Kurtović
Reflections (1987) – Mihailo
Zaboravljeni (1988) – Martin
The Glembays (1988) – Dr. phil. Leone Glembay
Klopka (1988) – Saša
Seobe II (1989) – Višnjevski
Povratak Katarine Kozul  (1989) – Silvio
Kuduz (1989) – Policeman Šemso
Silent Gunpowder (1990) – Španac
Captain America (1990) – Tadzio's father
Adam ledolomak (1990)
Moj brat Aleksa (1991)
Đuka Begović (1991) – Mata
Srećna dama (1991) – Boris
Story from Croatia (1991) – Andrija
Holiday in Sarajevo (1991) – Avduka Lipa
Countess Dora (1993) – Tuna, the driver
Vukovar: The Way Home (1994) – Martin
Gospa (1995) – Mayor Štović
Washed Out (1995) – Father
Nausikaja (1995) – Inspector Stevović
Nausikaja (1996)
The Perfect Circle (1997) – Hamza
Puška za uspavljivanje  (1997) – Karlo Štajner
Transatlantik (1998)
Četverored (1999) – Cute captain
Hop, Skip & Jump /short/ (2000)
Je li jasno prijatelju? (2000) – Nikola
No Man's Land (2001) – Old Serbian soldier
Polagana predaja (2001) – Banker Parać
Kraljica noći (2001) – Tomo's father
Prezimiti u Riju (2002) – Grga
Heimkehr (2003) – Vlado
Long Dark Night (2004) – Španac
Na planinčah (2004)
The Society of Jesus (2004) – Castelan
Secret Passage (2004) – Foscari's Informant
Days and Hours (2004) – Idriz
Mirage  (2004) – Teacher
 (2006) – Marks
Ničiji sin (2008) – Izidor
Kao rani mraz (2010) – Verebes
Daca bobul nu moare (2010) – Iorgovan
Piran-Pirano (2010) – Veljko
Cannibal Vegetarian (2012) – Pathologist Marelja
Halima's Path (2012) – Avdo
When Day Breaks (2012) – Professor Miša Brankov
Čefurji raus! (2013) – Čiča
The Brave Adventures of a Little Shoemaker (2013) – Good Košarac
For Good Old Times (2018) – Krcko
General (2019) – Janko Bobetko

Television

 (1971) – Iviša
Tomo Bakran (1978) – Koloman pl. Balloczanski
 (1980–1981) – Duje
Nitko se neće smijati (1985) – Milan
Pat pozicija (1986)
Doktorova noć (1990) – Doctor
Dok nitko ne gleda (1993)
Prepoznavanje (1996) – Ana's Father
Život sa žoharima (2000) – Gazda
Novo doba (2002) – Petar Strukan
Balkan Inc. (2006) – Bero Filipović
Neki čudni ljudi (2006–2007) – Vili S. Tončić
Lud, zbunjen, normalan (2007–2020) – Izet Fazlinović / Ismet Fazlinović (final appearance)
 (2019–2020) – Janko Bobetko

Awards

References

External links

1943 births
2020 deaths
People from Banja Luka
Bosniaks of Bosnia and Herzegovina
Bosniaks of Croatia
Yugoslav male actors
Bosnia and Herzegovina male actors
Croatian male actors
Golden Arena winners
Deaths from lung cancer in Croatia
Burials at Mirogoj Cemetery
Bosnian expatriate actors in Croatia